Yusuf Bilyarta Mangunwijaya (Ambarawa, Central Java, 6 May 1929 – Carolus Hospital, Paseban, Senen, Central Jakarta, 10 February 1999), was an Indonesian architect, writer, and Catholic religious leader. He was popularly known as Romo Mangun (Father Mangun).

Biography
Romo Mangun was the son of Yulianus Sumadi and Serafin Kamdaniyah. At the age of sixteen, he joined the People's Security Army during the Indonesian National Revolution and was shocked by the way the troops treated the villagers. In 1950, upon hearing a speech about the harmful effects of the revolution on civilians by one of the commanders, Major Isman, he decided to serve as a priest. He was ordained in 1959, while studying philosophy and theology at the "Institut Sancti Pauli" in Yogyakarta. He continued to study architecture in Aachen, Germany, and at the Aspen Institute of Humanistic Studies in Aspen, Colorado.

He was the author of many novels, short stories, essays and non-fiction works. He produced many anthology of novels such as Ikan-ikan Hiu, Ido, Homa (The Sharks, Ido, Homa), Roro Mendut, Durga/Umayi, Burung-Burung Manyar (The Weaverbirds), and his essays were published in various newspapers in Indonesia. His work, Sastra dan Religiositas (Literature and Religiosity) was awarded as the best non-fiction book in 1982, while his novel The Weaverbirds received the Ramon Magsaysay Award in 1996.

His disappointment with the Indonesian educational system triggered him to explore alternative systems that led to the establishment of the Foundation for Elementary Education Dynamics in 1987. He had also set up an explorative elementary school for the community that was displaced by the development of the Kedung Ombo reservoir in Central Java, as well as the poor in the Code River, Yogyakarta.

Romo Mangun was known as the father of modern Indonesian architecture. In 1992, he received the Aga Khan Award for Architecture for his work on the slum dwellers by the riverbank Code in Yogyakarta. He also received The Ruth and Ralph Erskine Fellowship in 1995, as recognition of his dedication to the less privileged. His work on the houses of the poor along the banks of the Code River contributed towards Mangunwijaya becoming one of Indonesia's most renowned architects. According to Erwinthon P. Napitupulu, the author of a book on Mangunwijaya, due to be published at the end of 2011, Mangun heads the list of the top 10 Indonesian architects.

Romo Mangun's dedication to helping those who were poor, oppressed and marginalised by politics through an "outcry of the voice of conscience"  made him a strong opponent of the Soeharto regime.

Awards
 Golden Windmill Award for fiction/literary works from Radio Nederland
 Aga Khan Award for Architecture 1992 for Kali Code, Yogyakarta
 Indonesian Institute of Architects Award 1991 for Marian Shrine in Sendangsono
 Ramon Magsaysay Award 1996

Architectural projects

 Kali Code Urban Settlement, Yogyakarta : Aga Khan Award 1992
 Sendangsono (Marian shrine)
 Semarang Apostolic Building
 Gedung Bentara Budaya, Jakarta
 Gereja Katolik Jetis, Yogyakarta
 Gereja Katolik Cilincing, Jakarta
 Markas Kowihan II
 Kampus II Universitas Surabaya
 Gereja Katolik Santa Maria Assumpta, Klaten- Jateng

Publications

Novels
 Romo Rahadi (1981, published under a pen name of Y. Wastu Wijaya)
 Burung-Burung Manyar (1981)
 Ikan-Ikan Hiu, Ido, Homa (1983)
 Balada Becak (1985)
 Durga Umayi (1985)
 Burung-Burung Rantau (1992)
 Balada Dara-Dara Mendut (1993)
 Pohon-Pohon Sesawi (1999)
 Rara Mendut, Genduk Duku, Lusi Lindri (2008, originally published as a trilogy in Kompas daily newspaper during 1982-1987)

Novels translated into English
 The Weaverbirds, translated by Thomas M. Hunter ; John H. McGlynn, editor. Lontar Foundation, 1991. 316 p.
 Durga/Umayi, translated by Ward Keeler. University of Washington Press ; Singapore : Singapore University Press, c2004. 212 p.

Anthologies of essays and short stories
 Sastra dan Religiositas (1982, Essays)
 Esei-Esei Orang Republik (1987, Essays)
 Tumbal: Kumpulan Tulisan Tentang Kebudayaan, Perikemanusiaan dan Kemasyarakatan (1994)
 Rumah Bambu (2000, Short stories)

Others
 Spiritualitas Baru
 Politik Hati Nurani
 Puntung-Puntung Roro Mendut (1978)
 Fisika Bangunan (1980)
 Pemasyarakatan Susastra Dipandang Dari Sudut Budaya (1986)
 Putri Duyung Yang Mendamba: Renungan Filsafat Hidup Manusia Modern Ragawidya (1986)
 Di Bawah Bayang-Bayang Adikuasa (1987)
 Wastu Citra, Buku Arsitektur (1988)
 Menuju Indonesia Serba Baru (1998)
 Menuju Republik Indonesia Serikat (1998)
 Gerundelan Orang Republik (1995)
 Gereja Diaspora (1999)
 Memuliakan Allah, Mengangkat Manusia (1999)
 Manusia Pascamodern, Semesta, dan Tuhan: Renungan Filsafat Hidup, Manusia Modern (1999)
 Tentara dan Kaum Bersenjata (1999)
 Menjadi Generasi Pasca-Indonesia: Kegelisahan Y.B. Mangunwijaya (1999)
 Merintis RI Yang Manusiawi: Republik Yang Adil dan Beradab (1999)
 Pasca-Indonesia, Pasca-Einstein (1999)
 Saya Ingin Membayar Utang Kepada Rakyat (1999)
 Kita Lebih Bodoh dari Generasi Soekarno-Hatta (2000)
 Soeharto Dalam Cerpen Indonesia (2001)
 Impian Dari Yogyakarta, (2003)

Literatures on Romo Mangun
 Sumartana, et al. Mendidik Manusia Merdeka Romo Y.B. Mangunwijaya 65 Tahun. Institut Dian/Interfedei dan Pustaka Pelajar, 1995. .
 Wahid, Abdurrahman. Romo Mangun Di Mata Para Sahabat. Kanisius, 1999. .
 Priyanahadi, et al. Y.B. Mangunwijaya, Pejuang Kemanusiaan. Kanisius, 1999. .
 Prawoto, Eko A. Tektonika Arsitektur Y.B. Mangunwijaya. Cemeti Art House Yogyakarta, 1999.
 Mengenang Y.B. Mangunwijaya, Pergulatan Intelektual dalam Era Kegelisahan. Kanisius, 1999. .
 Sindhunata. Menjadi Generasi Pasca-Indonesia, Kegelisahan Y.B. Mangunwijaya. Kanisius, 1999. .
 Purwatma. Romo Mangun Imam bagi Kaum Kecil. Kanisius, 2001. .
 Rahmanto, B. Y.B. Mangunwijaya: Karya dan Dunianya. Grasindo, 2001. .
 Yahya, Iip D. and Shakuntala, I.B. Romo Mangun Sahabat Kaum Duafa. Kanisius, 2005. .

References

External links
 Critical study of Mangunwijaya (includes quote from Major Isman)

1929 births
1999 deaths
20th-century Indonesian architects
20th-century Roman Catholic priests
Indonesian Roman Catholic priests
Indonesian male novelists
Indonesian male writers
People from Semarang Regency
Writers from Central Java
RWTH Aachen University alumni
Bandung Institute of Technology alumni